2019 Kazakhstan Super Cup was a Kazakhstan football match that was played on 3 March 2019 between the champions of 2018 Kazakhstan Premier League, Astana, and the winner of the 2018 Kazakhstan Cup, Kairat.

Match details

See also
2018 Kazakhstan Premier League
2018 Kazakhstan Cup

References

FC Astana matches
FC Kairat matches
2019
Supercup